AEK Athens Football Club, also known simply as AEK, AEK Athens (in European competitions), or with its full name Athlitiki Enosis Konstantinoupoleos (Athletic Union of Constantinople), is a Greek association football club based in Nea Filadelfeia suburb of Athens.

The club has amassed various records since its founding. Regionally, domestically and continentally, the club has set several records in winning various official and unofficial competitions. Established in Athens in 1924 by Greek refugees from Constantinople in the wake of the Greco-Turkish War, A.E.K. is one of the most successful clubs in Greek football, winning 32 national titles (including 12 Championships, 15 Greek Cups, 1 League Cup and 3 Super Cups). The team has appeared several times in European (UEFA Champions League and UEFA Europa League) competitions. AEK is a member of the European Club Association.

The club was relegated from the Greek Superleague after the 2012–13 season for the first time in its history. In an effort to discharge the immense debt created by years of mismanagement, its directors chose for the team to compete in the third tier Football League 2 for the 2013-14 season, thus turning the club into an amateur club. After 2 seasons on the lower tiers the club completed its comeback to the first division.

Seasons

See also
AEK Athens F.C.
History of AEK Athens F.C.
AEK Athens F.C. in European football
List of AEK Athens F.C. records and statistics

References

External links

Official websites
 Official website 
 AEK Athens at Super League Greece 
 AEK Athens at UEFA
 AEK Athens at FIFA
News sites
 AEK Athens on aek365.org 
 AEK Athens news from Nova Sports

Media
 AEK Athens on Facebook
 AEK Athens on YouTube
Other
 AEK Athens e-shop

 
Football
AEK Athens